Bawa Thanthayar is a 1956 Burmese black-and-white drama film, directed by Thukha starring Zeya, May Thit, Thukha and Aye Kyu. It is one of the most famous films in the history of Burmese cinema and was only released at the end of the year, but was the highest grossing film of 1956.

Making film
It was the debut film of Mandalay Film and was shot by Thukha in 1955 and took about a year.

International released 
On December 14, 1956, it broke the record for the highest grossing sound film in Rangoon cinemas. It earned Ks.5,02,567/-. It was premiered in China and earned £stg.3,000.

Cast
 May Thit
 Zeya
 Thukha
 Aye Kyu
 Gyan Sein

Awards

Soundtrack 
The song "Life Cycle", written and sung by Thukha and accompanied by U Ba Thein from Mandalay Film, is still popular today.

References

1956 films
Burmese black-and-white films
1950s Burmese-language films
Films shot in Myanmar
Burmese drama films
1956 drama films